Tashkent State, or simply Tashkent was an independent historical secessionist state in Central Asia, which constituted nowadays Tashkent Region as well as South Kazakhstan Region. It was declared in 1784 and ceased to exist in 1808, after being occupied by the Kokand Khanate. The capital of the country was Tashkent.

History

Background 
In the middle of the 18th century, a troubled period occurred in the history of Tashkent, when the city was at the crossroads of the interests of the Kalmyk Khanate, Kazakh Khanate, Kokand Khanate, and, to a lesser extent, Emirate of Bukhara. The city repeatedly passed from one ruler to another. In addition, there was an internecine war between four parts of the city – the  Kukcha, Sibzar, Sheykhantaur and Beshagach. The head of each of them – hakim - sought to subdue other regions.

By the 1780s, lengthy and bloody strife became intolerable. Many people of Tashkent voted for the creation of a single independent state, which would have a beneficial effect on trade and handicraft. At the same time, the Sheykhantaur hakim died, transferring the power to his son, Yunus Khoja.

Yunus Khoja's reign 
In 1784, the rivalry of the four parts of Tashkent resulted in an armed clash. The battle took place near a city bazaar, in a ravine, along which flows the Bozsu channel. This section of the channel became known as "Djangob" – "stream of battle". The victory was won by Yunus Khoja, and the posad recognized his authority over the whole city. As a residence, the ruler chose a fortress that stood on the dais on the bank of the Chorsu aryk (later this area has been named Karatash).

References 

History of Tashkent